Belarus–Pakistan relations refers to the current and historical relationship between Belarus and Pakistan. Pakistan was one of the first countries to recognise Belarus after the dissolution of the Soviet Union in 1991. Pakistan maintains an embassy in Minsk; Belarus maintains an embassy in Islamabad.

Economic relations
Pakistan and Belarus initiated joint ventures (JVs) in the textile, pharmaceutical and lighting solution industries while sharing technological expertise with each other.

Pakistan's imports from Belarus stood at $42.65 million which mainly consisted of tractors (62.04%), artificial filament yarn (13.01%) and rubber tires (8.06%).

Belarus has lauded Pakistan's role and efforts in bringing peace and stability to the world by countering terrorism and offered his country's full support in this fight.

State visits
President of Belarus Alexander Lukashenko visited Pakistan on 29 May 2015 on a two-day state visit and again on 4 October 2016.

President Lukashenko held meetings with Mamnoon Hussain and Nawaz Sharif during the course of his visit, and a number of important agreements and memoranda of understanding were signed between the two countries.

On 11 August 2015, the Prime Minister of Pakistan conducted a two-day state visit to Belarus.

The Prime Minister of Pakistan Imran Khan met the President Lukashenko on the sidelines of the Shanghai Cooperation Organisation held in Bishkek, Kyrgyzstan on June 14, 2019. Both heads of state agreed to hold more political exchanges and increase economic, commercial and investment cooperation.

Agreements
Pakistan and Belarus inked a number of agreements and memorandums of understanding (MoUs) to strengthen their multifaceted ties particularly in the areas of trade, commerce, education and culture.

References

External links
 Pakistan Belarus Friendship Society

 
Pakistan
Belarus